I Won't Go for More is a song by Belgian recording artist Selah Sue. It was written by Sue and Birsen Uçar and produced by Robin Hannibal for her second studio album Reason (2015), featuring co-production from Itai Shapira and Salva. Distributed by Warner Music Group, it was released as the album's third single by Because Music on June 15, 2015.

Credits and personnel 
Credits adapted from the Reason liner notes.

 Andrew Dawson – mixing
 Robin Hannibal – producer, instruments
 Mike Malchicoff – mixing assistance
 Jake Najor – drums 
 Sam Robles – baritone saxophone
 Paul Salva – drums, percussion, co-production
 Itai Shapira – bass, guitar, co-production
 Todd Simon – flugelhorn, trumpet 
 Sanne Putseys – composer
 Birsen Uçar – lyrics
 Tracy Wannomae – alto saxophone, bass clarinet, flute, tenor saxophone

Charts

References

External links
SelahSue.com – official website

2014 songs
2015 singles
Selah Sue songs
Songs written by Selah Sue
Because Music singles